Großrosseln is a village and a municipality in the district of Saarbrücken, in Saarland, Germany. It is situated on the border with France, approximately 12 km west of Saarbrücken. The neighbouring municipality in France is Petite-Rosselle.

Geography
The Gemeinde (municipality) of Großrosseln is divided into 6 Gemeindebezirke (municipal districts): the main one Großrosseln, is where the Rathaus (town hall), Dorf im Warndt, Emmersweiler, Karlsbrunn, Naßweiler and the church of Sankt Nikolaus are found.

Economy and Infrastructure
 Hammerschmitt (fashion store)
 Funeral Karl Fuss
 Megro GmbH & Co. KG (hulling mill, Juchem-Group)
 Natursteine Herz (virgin stone business)

Culture
Carnival association KV Doll Doll.

Personalities
Karlsbrunn was the birthplace of Dwight D. Eisenhower's early ancestor Hans Nicolas Eisenhauer, who emigrated to Pennsylvania in 1741.
The football players Manuel Zeitz, Hendrick Zuck and Christian Weber played also for SC Großrosseln.

Twin towns
 Morsbach (Germany)
 Petite-Rosselle (France)
 Rosbruck (France)

Gallery

References

External links
 

Divided cities
Saarbrücken (district)